The Institute for the Study of Economic and Social Development (IEDES) is an autonomous part of the University of Paris or Panthéon Sorbonne.

History

Creation and Historical Context

Following World War 2, on October 10th, 1946, the first National Assembly of the French Fourth Republic was chosen. Three days later, on October 13th, a new French constitution was also selected through a referendum. The new political system implemented by France had to face a difficult post-war reality.
  
About two years after the announcement of the surrender of Japan to the allies on 15 August 1945, United States Secretary of State George Marshall proposed economic assistance of the United States 'in the return of normal economic health in the world' on 5 June 1947. The same year, 16 countries gathered at Paris to answer to Marshall's proposal, and from their debates a common program and a new organisation, the OEEC (Organisation for European Economic Cooperation) founded on 16 April 1948, emerged. The OEEC, precursor of the OECD (Organisation for Economic Co-operation and Development), was created mainly to coordinate efforts under the European Recovery Program (Marshall Plan) for the reconstruction of a continent devastated by war. The total economic assistance provided by the ERP from April 3, 1947 to the program's end on December 1951 totaled about twelve billion dollars. By 1948 the ERP (Marshall Plan) had brought western Europe under the influence of the United States and the Soviet Union had already installed openly communist governments in eastern Europe. This marked the start of the Cold War which followed the Second World War.

On 4 April 1949, during the Marshall Plan, France signed with 11 other countries the North Atlantic Treaty, creating the North Atlantic Treaty Organisation (NATO), a unified military command  to act as a counterweight against the soviet military presence in central and eastern Europe. Latter same year, Soviet Union was able to detonate their first atomic warhead, the RDS-1, ending the United States' previous monopoly on atomic weapons. In 1950 the communist government of North Korea, supported by the Soviets, invaded U.S. supported South Korea, starting the Korean War, which lasted until 1953. There was a period of relative calm in the Cold War between 1953 and 1957, largely due to Joseph Stalin's death in 1953.

However, the French reality will continue to evolve thought different aspects. On Mars 2, 1956 France recognized though an agreement judging the Treaty of Fes as expired Morocco's independence, few days latter on Mars 20, 1956 the kingdom of Tunisia achieved its total independence from France  as well.

Finally, on October the 4th 1957, the Sputnik 1, the first artificial earth satellite is launched by the Soviet Union, announcing within the context of the Cold War, the beginning of the Space Age.

It is at a moment at which the Cold War was taking place and causing the beginning of the Space Age, under the post Second World War and European reconstruction context, under the political system of the fourth republic, and with some of the ancient French colonies having recently acquired their independence, that the Institute for the Study of Economic and Social Development is created by decree of the French government on October 15, 1957, within the framework of the University of Paris University of Paris.

Publications
Publications include the Third World collection and the Third World review.

IEDES signed international cooperation agreements with many African and Latin American  universities and supports projects implemented by international organizations such as UNESCO. The Institute is part of scientific networks involving countries with varying living standards.

The Institute is located on the “tropical Jardin de Paris” campus (former site of the Universal Exhibition in Paris) and works in collaboration with CIRAD, CIRED, IRD, INRA and CEDIMES.

References

External links
Umr-developpement-societes.univ-paris1.fr

Universities in Paris
Economic development organizations
Social science institutes
Economic research institutes
Research institutes in France